Vega is a parish of the municipality of Gijón / Xixón, in Asturias, Spain.

Its population was 3,507 in 2012.

Vega is a residential and rural area, bordering with the districts of Granda, Castiello Bernueces, Santurio, Caldones, Llavandera y Samartín de Güerces.

The famous La Camocha coal mine (closed 2007) was located in Vega. The mining town of La Camocha (including El Vaticano and Ciudad Virginia barrios) is located in the mine surroundings.

Villages and their neighbourhoods
Aroles
La Camocha
Vega de Baxo
Ciudad Virginia / Los Bloques
La Iglesia
La Piquiella
La Parada
Les Prairíes
Vega de Riba
Camarranes
Paniceres
La Pomarada
El Vaticano

External links
 Official Toponyms - Principality of Asturias website.
 Official Toponyms: Laws - BOPA Nº 229 - Martes, 3 de octubre de 2006 & DECRETO 105/2006, de 20 de septiembre, por el que se determinan los topónimos oficiales del concejo de Gijón.

Parishes in Gijón